Lasioglossum punctatum is a species of halictid bee found in Indonesia. It was first described in 1858 as Nomia punctata.

The same name was used for an Australian bee described in 1879. As a junior homonym, that species required renaming and is now considered Lasioglossum exlautum.

References

punctatum
Insects described in 1858